The North Atlantic Conference men's basketball tournament is the annual conference basketball championship tournament for the NCAA Division III North Atlantic Conference. It is a single-elimination tournament and seeding is based on regular season records.

The winner, declared conference champion, receives the North Atlantic's automatic bid to the NCAA Men's Division III Basketball Championship.

Results
 Record is incomplete prior to 2004

Championship records
Results incomplete before 2004

 Schools highlighted in pink are former members of the North Atlantic
 Cazenovia, Maine Maritime, Maine–Presque Isle, Northern Vermont–Johnson, and SUNY Cobleskill have not yet qualified for the tournament finals
 Becker, Green Mountain, Mount Ida, and Wheelock never qualified for the tournament finals as North Atlantic members

References

NCAA Division III men's basketball conference tournaments
Basketball Tournament, Men's